Winnipeg—St. James was a federal electoral district in the province of Manitoba, Canada, that was represented in the House of Commons of Canada from 1979 to 1997. It was in the north end of the city of Winnipeg. This riding was created in 1976 from parts of Winnipeg North Centre and Winnipeg South Centre ridings.

The electoral district was abolished in 1996, when it was re-distributed between Charleswood—Assiniboine and Winnipeg North Centre ridings.

Electoral history

|-
  
|Progressive Conservative
|LANE, Bob  
|align="right"|12,640
 
|New Democratic Party
|SYMS, J. Frank  
|align="right"| 11,747 
  
|Liberal
|MERCIER, Richard 
|align="right"|7,636 

|-
 
|New Democratic Party
|KEEPER, Cyril 
|align="right"| 11,078   
  
|Progressive Conservative
|LANE, Bob  
|align="right"|10,640
  
|Liberal
|MERCIER, Richard
|align="right"| 7,531 

|-
  
|Progressive Conservative
|MINAKER, George  
|align="right"| 12,523 
 
|New Democratic Party
| DONNER, Lissa  
|align="right"|9,843 
  
|Liberal
| RYBACK, Diana 
|align="right"|6,007 

|-
  
|Liberal
|HARVARD, John
|align="right"|18,695
  
|Progressive Conservative
|MINAKER, George
|align="right"|16,993 
 
|New Democratic Party
|SAWATSKY, Len
|align="right"|4,258 

 
|No affiliation
|LLOYD, Linda 
|align="right"| 106

See also
 List of Canadian federal electoral districts
 Past Canadian electoral districts

External links
 

Former federal electoral districts of Manitoba
St. James, Winnipeg